"To Each His Own" is a popular song with music written by Jay Livingston and lyrics by Ray Evans. It is the title song of the movie of the same name and was published in 1946 by Paramount Music. The duo were assigned to write this song after film composer Victor Young turned it down.

Original 1946 recordings
In 1946, three different versions hit number one on the Billboard charts in the United States. Two other versions reached number three and number four.  
On the Billboard "Most Played" chart for August 24, 1946, and again on September 7, September 14 and October 5, all five versions appeared simultaneously in the Top Ten. While many popular songs of the pre-rock period had multiple hit versions – for example, "Dinah" had nine top ten covers over the years, and fifteen versions of "St. Louis Blues" charted between 1916 and 1953 – according to its co-composer Ray Evans, "To Each His Own" is the only song to take up half the slots on the Top Ten at the same time.
Eddy Howard reached number one after debuting on the Most Played On the Air chart with his version of the song on July 6, 1946. Released by Majestic Records as catalog number 7188 and 1070, the single lasted 24 weeks on the chart, reaching the top spot on August 3 for eight weeks, and scoring number 1 single of 1946  The two Howard releases had different B sides – "Cynthia's in Love" on Majestic 7188 and "Careless" on Majestic 1070.
Freddy Martin & his Orchestra, featuring vocals by Stuart Wade, and Tony Martin both had their versions debut on the chart on August 8, 1946, with each remaining on the chart for twelve weeks. While Freddy Martin, whose version was released by RCA Victor Records, was able to top the chart for two weeks, Tony Martin's version, released by Mercury Records, peaked at number four.
The next version to reach the Billboard charts was performed by The Modernaires with Paula Kelly. Released by Columbia Records, together they debuted on the chart on August 15, 1946, lasting fourteen weeks on the chart and peaking at number three.
The third recording to reach number one was by The Ink Spots, which was released by Decca Records. Reaching the charts on August 29, 1946, it remained on the chart for fourteen weeks, and topped it on September 21. This version also reached number three on the Most-Played Juke Box Race Records chart.

1946 was the first full year where Billboard ran its three main popular charts, "Best Selling", "Most Played Jukebox", and "Most Air Play". Each week in each section, 15 points were awarded for No. 1, 9 points for No. 2, 8 points for No. 3, and so on. There were no ties. The totals of all 3 categories were combined, and the highest numbers won. "For Each His Own" by Eddy Howard was the no. 1 record of the year, leading the runner-up by over 100 points.

Other recordings
Margie Rayburn released a version of the song as a single in 1958, but it did not chart.
Johnny Hartman included a version on his 1959 And I Thought About You album.
The Platters covered "To Each His Own" in 1960, their version reaching number 21 (US).
Sam Cooke recorded the song for his 1965 LP Try a Little Love. 
Jerry Vale recorded it for his 1968 LP You Don't Have to Say You Love Me. 
Frankie Laine's 1968 version reached No. 82 on the U.S. Billboard Hot 100. It also spent four weeks at number two on the Easy Listening chart.
Keely Smith recorded it for her 1962 Dot LP, Cherokeely Swings.
Ronnie Dove recorded the song for his Right or Wrong album in 1964.
The song was also performed in the 1990 film The Godfather Part III by Al Martino's character, Johnny Fontane.

References

1946 songs
1946 singles
1958 singles
1960 singles
1964 singles
1968 singles
Songs with music by Jay Livingston
Songs with lyrics by Ray Evans
Songs written for films
Frankie Laine songs
Margie Rayburn songs
Number-one singles in the United States
ABC Records singles
Liberty Records singles
Mercury Records singles
Eddy Howard songs